SCH Dirty Lo-Fi Archive 1984–2008 is a 4-DVD SET collection by SCH, including shots recorded "nomatterhow", gigs, TV interviews, promotional clips, and other archival material documenting 25 years of the existence and work of the Sarajevo alternative rock band.

Bonus Material
 SCH Live at Mochvara (DVD)
Concert in Zagreb, on 13 March 2008

 SCH Video Compilation (DVD)
A promo compilation of the full length 4-DVD set

References

External links
 SCH Official Media Page
 SCH YouTube Channel

SCH (band) albums
2008 albums